Marant is a commune in the Pas-de-Calais department in the Hauts-de-France region of France.

Geography
Marant is situated 3 miles (5 km) east of Montreuil-sur-Mer, on the D129 road.

Population

See also
 Communes of the Pas-de-Calais department

References

Communes of Pas-de-Calais